Revolución de Amor is the sixth studio album (sixteenth overall) recorded by Mexican rock band Maná, It was released by WEA Latina on August 20, 2002 (see 2002 in music). Allmusic considers it one of their strongest and most consistent albums. Critics of the band deride it for being too slick and polished, with an "arena rock" aura, but others consider it to have some of their strongest writing. The album gave Maná its fourth Grammy.

The songs have various influences; from Mexican elements on "Mariposa Traicionera" to a salsa-influenced groove on "No Voy A Ser Tu Esclavo" and "Sabanas Frías."  "Ay, Doctor" is infused with the sounds of African ska. Musical guests featured Carlos Santana, Rubén Blades and Asdrubal Sierra (vocalist from Ozomatli) performed on this record.

Track listing

Revolución de Amor: 2003 Tour Edition
Revolución de Amor: 2003 Tour Edition this is a special re-release of Revolución de Amor from the 2003 Revolución de Amor Tour in Spain, released on July 19, 2005. "Eres Mi Religión" features Italian rock singer Zucchero. The CD came bundled with a special DVD features that include music videos, a documentary of the Zucchero recording session, and promotion of the Germany and France tours.

DVD
"Ángel De Amor" music video
"Eres Mi Religión" music video
"Mariposa Traicionera" music video
Documentary of the Selva Negra foundation
Recording session "Eres Mi Religión" with Zucchero
Promotions of the Germany and France tour
Photos galler

Charts

Sales and certifications

References

2002 albums
2005 albums
Maná albums
Warner Music Latina albums
Spanish-language albums
Latin Grammy Award for Best Engineered Album
Grammy Award for Best Latin Rock, Urban or Alternative Album
Latin Grammy Award for Best Rock Album by a Duo or Group with Vocal